Gabriel Barbosa Avelino (born 17 March 1999), known as Gabriel Barbosa, is a Brazilian professional footballer who plays as a forward for Albanian club Kukësi, on loan from Levadiakos.

Career 
In June 2021, Palmeiras sent Barbosa to FC Seoul on loan.

Career statistics

Club

Honours
Levadiakos
Super League 2: 2021–22

References

External links 
 	

1999 births
Living people
Brazilian footballers
Brazilian expatriate footballers
Association football forwards
Campeonato Brasileiro Série B players
Campeonato Brasileiro Série C players
S.P.A.L. players
Sociedade Esportiva Palmeiras players
Londrina Esporte Clube players
Figueirense FC players
Paysandu Sport Club players
FC Seoul players
Levadiakos F.C. players
FK Kukësi players
Brazilian expatriate sportspeople in China
Expatriate footballers in China
Brazilian expatriate sportspeople in Italy
Expatriate footballers in Italy
Brazilian expatriate sportspeople in South Korea
Expatriate footballers in South Korea
Brazilian expatriate sportspeople in Greece
Expatriate footballers in Greece
Brazilian expatriate sportspeople in Albania
Expatriate footballers in Albania
K League 1 players
Super League Greece 2 players
Super League Greece players
Kategoria Superiore players
Sportspeople from Goiás